This is a list of episodes from The New Scooby-Doo Movies television series. The episode titles given reflect Hanna-Barbera studio records and TV Guide listings. The episode "Wednesday Is Missing" has not been released on DVD yet due to an appearance rights conflict with the creators of The Addams Family.

Series overview

Episodes

Season 1 (1972)

Season 2 (1973)

Home media

VHS releases
 Hanna Barbera Personal Favorites – Scooby-Doo (compilation of various episodes, including "The Secret of Shark Island") (available in US and UK)
 "The Secret of Shark Island" (UK)
 "Scooby-Doo Meets the Addams Family" (Australia)

DVD

Blu-ray

See also 
 Night of the Living Doo
 List of Batman: The Brave and the Bold episodes — in episode 51, Batman and Robin have a third adventure with the Scooby Gang involving Weird Al. A reference is made to episodes 2 and 15 (from September and December 1972's first season)

References 

Lists of Scooby-Doo television series episodes
Lists of American children's animated television series episodes